Laurent Riboulet (18 April 1871 in Lille, France – 4 September 1960 in Lille, France) was a tennis player competing for France. He reached two singles finals at the Amateur French Championships, winning in 1893 over defending champion Jean Schopfer, and losing in 1895 to 1894 winner André Vacherot.

Grand Slam finals

References

19th-century French people
19th-century male tennis players
French Championships (tennis) champions
French male tennis players
Sportspeople from Lille
1871 births
1960 deaths